On the Edge is a novel by British author Nigel Hinton and was first published in 2014. It follows the story of two boys whose mentally unstable father, who is an ex serviceman, takes them on holiday but suspicions arise.

Plot
Fifteen-year-old Dillon and his ten-year-old brother Robbie were home alone when Robbie received a telephone call from their father who they had not seen for two years after he beat up Dillon and his mother. Their father said he wanted to take them on holiday saying that their mother said it was OK despite his restraining order. Robbie was excited about the idea but Dillon was suspicious. Dad came round in a brand new 4x4 and dressed in his army gear. After talking to their father Dillon decided to go but left a note on his bed just in case.

When they stopped at a motorway service station Dillon decided to call Mum’s boyfriend Andy as Mum left her mobile at home and he did not have her office number but Dad removed the battery and the SIM card from Dillon’s mobile and Robbie left his at home.

When they arrived at Gardle Head they set up camp near the cliff top and slept in a hollow.

In the morning after breakfast Dad set up two snares to catch rabbits for dinner then they went swimming and skipping stones on the beach. That evening Robbie was squeamish about eating the rabbit due to his vegetarianism but accepted the meat to please his Dad. When Dad sent Dillon to the car to get drinks he found the note he left for Mum which Dad had removed before they left and a shotgun in a black leather case.

The next morning Dad saved the scrambled egg for Robbie whilst Dillon and their Dad ate the cold leftover rabbit. They spent the rest of the morning building a sandcastle on the beach and in the afternoon they lazed around on the top of the cliff. On their way to Dartley for the evening Dillon went into a shop for ice creams and saw photographs of him and Robbie on the front page of a newspaper. When they got to Dartley they had a huge fish and chip supper and went to the funfair. On the way out from Dartley Dad noticed photos of himself and the boys on the television whilst passing a Chinese takeaway.

Before bed Dad got the boys to say the prayer Now I Lay Me Down to Sleep with the line If I die before I wake. Dillon saw Dad acting strangely and fearing that their father was mentally ill again and was about to kill them Dillon woke Robbie and led him down to the beach and hid behind a rock in the sea. Dad could be heard singing the nursery rhyme Bye, baby Bunting. When Dillon was sure it was safe they went back to the top of the cliff. As they passed the camp Dad came out of hiding and led them to the edge of the cliff with the shotgun about to shoot them. At the last minute Dad wondered what he was doing and shot himself. He got blown off the edge and his body was lost at sea.

The two boys walked to the road and were stopped by a passing police car where they were reunited with their mother.

Six weeks later Dad’s body washed up on a beach 50 miles south of Gardle head. The two boys and their mother decided not to go to the funeral but changed their minds on the night before. At the service they met a fellow mourner called Steve Selby who was in the army with Dad. According to Steve, Scott saved his life when he was wounded and trapped by enemy fire but the war messed up a lot of good men such as Scott.

References

External links
 Product page on the publisher's website

2014 British novels
Novels by Nigel Hinton